The Tagaytay City Science National High School (Mataas na Paaralang Pambansa na Pang-Agham ng Lungsod ng Tagaytay) is a public science high school in Sungay West, Tagaytay, Cavite, Philippines.

Former Mayor Francis N. Tolentino initiated the establishment of the Tagaytay City Science National High School (TCSNHS) on June 1987.

The school started with six classroom until it gradually expanded with additional classrooms to cater to the increasing number of students. Soon, additional facilities were built.

Science high schools in the Philippines
High schools in Cavite
Education in Tagaytay